Luke Fenn (born 10 October 2001), professionally known as Krystal Versace, is an English drag queen best known for winning the third series of the reality show RuPaul's Drag Race UK. Crowned at the age of 19, Krystal is the youngest ever Drag Race winner. She is from Tunbridge Wells in Kent and has Greek Cypriot heritage via her maternal grandmother, being the first descendant of Cypriots to compete in the franchise.

Career
Krystal Versace started doing drag at the age of 13. In August 2021, Versace was announced as one of the twelve contestants to be competing on the third series of RuPaul's Drag Race UK. She won the first two main challenges, one of which including a top two lip sync against Victoria Scone to "Total Eclipse of the Heart" by Bonnie Tyler. In the ninth episode, she landed on bottom two with Vanity Milan and had to lip sync to "Hallucinate" by Dua Lipa, ultimately winning and moving on to the top three alongside Ella Vaday and Kitty Scott-Claus. As part of the last main challenge, they had to write, record, and perform their own verse to a remix of "Hey Sis, It's Christmas" by RuPaul. After a lip sync for the crown to Dusty Springfield's cover of "You Don't Own Me", Versace was declared victorious, becoming not only the franchise's youngest finalist, but also the youngest ever winner.

Personal life 
Fenn uses she/her pronouns while in drag and he/him pronouns out of drag. Fenn is dyslexic.

Discography

As lead artist

As featured artist

Filmography

Television

Web series

Music videos

Awards and nominations

References

External links
 

2001 births
Living people
21st-century English LGBT people
English drag queens
English people of Greek Cypriot descent
Gay entertainers
People with dyslexia
RuPaul's Drag Race UK winners